A list of films produced in Italy in 1967 (see 1967 in film):

References

Footnotes

Sources

External links
Italian films of 1967 at the Internet Movie Database

Lists of 1967 films by country or language
1967
Films